Guillermo "Bill" Wagner Granizo (March 11, 1923 – November 1995) is an American artist, known for his brightly colored ceramic tile murals which often featured historical or autobiographical references. He was active in Northern California from 1970 to 1995, and lived in San Francisco, Ben Lomond, San Jose, and Benicia.

Early life and education 
He was named William Joseph Wagner, and was born in San Francisco, California on March 11, 1923. His mother Dora Granizo was Nicaraguan, and his father Joseph Wagner was of German descent and from the East Coast. He lived in Guatemala and Nicaragua for eleven years in childhood. Upon returning to San Francisco he attended St. Dominic’s School in the Western Addition neighborhood, and High School of Commerce.

He served in the US Army during World War II and was injured on Utah Beach during D-Day. After the war, he attended San Francisco College of Art for a year.

Career 
Granizo worked as an art director at KRON-TV, a television station in the San Francisco Bay Area in the 1950s, and later worked on directing educational films. 

He started doing ceramic tile murals in 1970, and at that time he changed his name to Guillermo Wagner Granizo. He worked with the Stonelight Tile Company of San Jose for many years. His works are made of brightly colored ceramic tiles, and feature bold geometric shapes and abstract characters. He would often sign his work "BWG".

Personal life 
After World War II, Granizo married Amalia Mary "Mollie" Castillo, from a prominent Guatemala family. They had two sons and divorced in the early 1970s.

Granizo's second marriage was to artist Lark Lucas, and they lived in Ben Lomond, California. They separated in 1984, and Granizo moved to San Jose, California to be closer to the tile factory.

Granizo moved to Benicia, California in 1980 and resided there until his death in 1995. He died in November 1995 in Benicia, from cancer.

Public art work 
This is a select list of notable public artwork created by Granizo, and listed by year of creation.

References

External links 
 Video: Monday on Strange Inheritance: Eight Tons of Art (2017) by Strange Inheritance on Fox Business

1923 births
1995 deaths
Artists from San Francisco
American ceramists
American muralists
American people of Nicaraguan descent
American people of German descent
Public art in California
American male artists
Nicaraguan artists
United States Army personnel of World War II